Grassy Creek is a  long 2nd order tributary to Elkin Creek in Wilkes and Surry Counties, North Carolina.

Course
Grassy Creek rises about 0.25 miles northwest of State Road in Wilkes County, North Carolina.  Grassy Creek then takes a southerly course bending into Surry County and back into Wilkes County to join Elkin Creek at about 2 miles northwest of Elkin, North Carolina.

Watershed
Grassy Creek drains  of area, receives about 50.1 in/year of precipitation, has a wetness index of 378.99, and is about 48% forested.

References

Rivers of North Carolina
Rivers of Surry County, North Carolina
Rivers of Wilkes County, North Carolina